Pharaoh is an American  power metal band.

Band history 
The band was formed in 1997 in Pennsylvania by four American musicians but the musical roots of Pharaoh come from European power metal acts.
Featuring  Tim Aymar, who is best known for his vocals on Control Denied, Chris Kerns on bass, Matt Johnsen on guitar and Chris Black on drums, they released their debut After the Fire in 2003. The band is known for multi-layered instrumentation and well produced albums.

Pharaoh has collaborated with many notable musicians including guitarist Chris Poland (OHM, ex-Megadeth) on The Longest Night album  and King Diamond guitarist Mike Wead on the Bury The Light album.

Discography

References

External Links 
 

American power metal musical groups
American progressive metal musical groups
Musical groups established in 1997
Heavy metal musical groups from Pennsylvania
1997 establishments in Pennsylvania
Musical groups from Philadelphia